Multi-National Security Transition Command – Iraq (MNSTC-I) was a training and organizational-support command of the United States Department of Defense. It was established in June 2004. It was a military formation of Multi-National Force – Iraq responsible for developing, organizing, training, equipping, and sustaining the Iraqi Ministry of Defense (MoD), with the Iraqi Armed Forces, including the Iraqi Counter Terrorism Service; and the Ministry of Interior (Iraq) with the Iraqi Police and Border Enforcement, Facilities Protection, and other forces. It was headquartered in the International Zone in Baghdad at Phoenix Base, a former elementary school.

The Office of Security Cooperation, which existed for only 3 months, was replaced by the Office of Security Transition (OST). General Petraeus first took command of the Office of Security Transition. The OST, whose lifespan was a mere month, was effectively only a name change for the Office of Security Cooperation. The OST was replaced by MNSTC-I. 

MNSTC-I's mission was to assist the Defense and Interior Ministries by improving the quality of the ISF and institutional performance. MNSTC-I aimed for the ISF to increasingly assume responsibility for population protection and develop Iraqi security institutions capable of sustaining security with reduced Coalition involvement. Therefore, the MNSTC-I mission was a central part of the U.S. exit strategy.

Among the advisors sent were large numbers of both Army National Guard, including both line battalions and Special Forces, and United States Army Reserve, including significant elements of the 98th Division. Owen West's book The Snake Eaters includes open complaints about the quality of advisors; there was a perception that mentoring teams were staffed with "leftovers." Advisors did not arrive prepared: their knowledge of Iraqi culture and Islam was "literally power point deep."

Creation and organization 
The command was a direct outgrowth of the need to create a new Iraqi Army under the Coalition Provisional Authority. To do this  the Coalition Military Assistance Training Team (CMATT) was established under Major General Paul Eaton. Separate efforts under the State Department were designed to build a new police force through the [Civilian Police Assistance Team] and advisory missions to the Ministries of Defense and Interior. All of these missions were consolidated under the new command MNSTC-I.

MNSTC-I was originally organized into three training teams, listed below, but later grew dramatically as newer missions and needs were identified.
The three former organizations were:
 Coalition Military Assistance Training Team, which organized, trained, and equipped the Iraqi Army.
 JHQ-ST – Joint Headquarters Advisory Support Team, which assisted the joint headquarters of the Iraqi Army in developing a command and control system. Also, JHQ assisted in operational planning and gave strategic advice to the Iraqi government.
 Civilian Police Assistance Training Team (CPATT), which organized, trained, and equipped the Iraqi Police.

MNSTC-I expanded from the three original organizations to consists of the following subordinate units organized under the Directorate of Defense Affairs and Directorate of Interior Affairs:
 Coalition Army Advisory Training Team (CAATT) to build the Iraqi Army
 Coalition Air Force Transition Team (CAFTT) to build the Iraqi Air Force, established 18 November 2005. The CAFTT at its beginning had some 17 members, a four-fold increase over the original CMATT Air Cell. This mission later involved the 370th Air Expeditionary Advisory Group.
 Maritime Strategic Transition Team (MaSTT) to support the Iraqi Navy, Marines and Coast Guard
 Civilian Police Assistance Training Team (CPATT) building the various Iraqi police agencies
 Intelligence Transition Team (ITT) to build the military and police information organizations
 Iraqi National Counter-Terrorism Task Force (INCTF) to assist Iraqi special operations (probably including the Iraqi National Counter-Terrorism Force)
 Security Assistance Office (SAO) to assist in the purchase of equipment and overseas training
 Joint Headquarters Assistance Team (JHQ-AT) to advise the Iraqi Joint Headquarters
 Ministry of Defense Transition Team (MOD-TT) to advise the MoD staff
 Ministry of Interior Transition Team (MOI-TT) to advise the MoI staff

In addition, the organization partnered with the NATO Training Mission – Iraq (NTM-I) as the commander of MNSTC-I is "dual hatted" as the NTM-I commander as well.

In June 2009, the organization structure changed again with the creation of the Iraqi Training and Advisory Mission (ITAM) led by US Army Major General Richard J. Rowe, Jr, the Iraqi Security Assistance Mission (ISAM), and the Partnership Strategy Group (PSG-I).  ITAM and ISAM, INCTF and PSG-I report to the Deputy Commanding General.
ITAM was focused on institutional training while ISAM focused on Foreign Military Sales.
Under the new ITAM structure:
 Coalition Army Advisory Training Team (CAATT) became ITAM-Army
 Coalition Air Force Transition Team (CAFTT) became ITAM-Air Force
 Maritime Strategic Transition Team (MaSTT) became ITAM-Navy
 Civilian Police Assistance Training Team (CPATT) became ITAM-Police
 Intelligence Transition Team (ITT) became ITAM-Intel TT
 Ministry of Defense Transition Team (MOD-TT) became ITAM-MOD
 Ministry of Interior Transition Team (MOI-TT) became ITAM-MOI

Under the new PSG-I structure:
Joint Headquarters Assistance Team (JHQ-AT) was absorbed into the PSG-I organization.

ISAM:
The organizations under ISAM mirror ITAM, though it took over the duties of the Security Assistance Office (SAO).
ISAM Army
ISAM Navy
ISAM Air Force
ISAM Logistics/End Use Monitoring (LOG/EUM)
ISAM International Military Education and Training/Out of Country Training (IMET/OCT)

MNSTC-I published a monthly magazine, The Advisor, with information on the training of the Iraqi Security Forces.

MNSTC-I was replaced by United States Forces – Iraq in 2010. MNSTC–I became U.S. Forces – Iraq, Advising and Training, which was under a major general who remained double-hatted as Commander, NATO Training Mission – Iraq.

Kalinovsky cites Visser and argues the U.S. training mission was "delegitimizing."

Commanders 

 Lieutenant General David H. Petraeus - assumed command of Office of Security Transition, June 4, 2004
 Lieutenant General David H. Petraeus - MNSTC-I stands up, June 28, 2004 - September 2005
 Lieutenant General Martin E. Dempsey (September 2005 – June 2007)
 Lieutenant General James M. Dubik (June 2007 – July 2008)
 Lieutenant General Frank Helmick (July 2008 – October 2009)
 Lieutenant General Michael D. Barbero (October 2009 - January 2011)

Michael Ferriter was the successor Deputy Commander, Advising and Training, United States Forces - Iraq, from January to October 2011.

References

 
 https://web.archive.org/web/20090728205509/http://www.mnstci.iraq.centcom.mil/Org_Chart4/default.htm - Organization chart July 28, 2009

Multinational force involved in the Iraq War
Training units and formations
Military units and formations established in 2004
Military units and formations disestablished in 2010